James Ray Hart (born January 1, 1944) is an American professional wrestling manager, executive, composer, and musician currently signed with WWE in a Legends deal. He is best known for his work in the World Wrestling Federation (WWF) and World Championship Wrestling (WCW), where he used the nickname "The Mouth of the South" (one that was also given to Ted Turner).

Regarded by many to be one of the greatest managers in professional wrestling history, Hart has managed the likes of The Honky Tonk Man, Bret Hart (no relation) and Jim Neidhart (The Hart Foundation), Greg "The Hammer" Valentine, Jerry "The King" Lawler, "The Million Dollar Man" Ted DiBiase, Irwin R. Schyster, The Mountie, The Natural Disasters, Dino Bravo, the Nasty Boys, The Giant, and Hulk Hogan. He was briefly the AWA Southern Heavyweight Champion in 1981.

Before becoming involved with professional wrestling, Hart was a member of rock band The Gentrys, best known for their 1965 top five Billboard Hot 100 hit, "Keep on Dancing".

Professional wrestling career

Memphis Wrestling (1978-1985)
Jimmy Hart was born in Jackson, Mississippi. He was brought into wrestling by Jerry "The King" Lawler, who knew of Hart because both had attended Memphis Treadwell High School. Having been asked to sing back-up with Lawler, Hart later became Lawler's manager. After splitting from Lawler, Hart created a stable known as the First Family of Wrestling to attack Lawler, which among others included Hulk Hogan, King Kong Bundy, "Ravishing" Rick Rude, "Leaping" Lanny Poffo, Jim "The Anvil" Neidhart, Ox Baker, Kamala, "Macho Man" Randy Savage, "Hot Stuff" Eddie Gilbert, The Iron Sheik and Kevin Sullivan.

In 1982, Hart earned national headlines doing a program with comedian and television star Andy Kaufman. Hart, Lawler and Kaufman would continue this feud for over a year. Around this time, Hart became known as "The Wimp", a nickname given to him by Lawler and chanted by fans, and was the subject of the song "Wimpbusters," which was sung by Lawler to the tune of "Ghostbusters" by Ray Parker Jr.; a music video was also made featuring Lawler, announcer Lance Russell, and wrestlers such as Randy Savage, Jimmy Valiant, Dutch Mantel, Tommy Rich, and Rufus R. Jones, along with footage of Lawler beating Hart and his "First Family". In 1981 through 1984, Hart led Austin Idol, Masao Ito, and Gilbert to NWA/AWA International titles.

World Wrestling Federation (1985–1993)

In 1985, Hart's friend Hillbilly Jim recommended him to WWF owner Vince McMahon, who hired him. He was nicknamed "The Mouth of the South" due to his loose-lipped style, often augmented by his trademark megaphone, which he used to instruct and encourage his protégés, to discourage and annoy opponents and announcers (especially Gorilla Monsoon) and also as a weapon. Hart's first acquisition in the WWF was Greg "The Hammer" Valentine, then the Intercontinental Heavyweight Champion, whom Hart managed at WrestleMania. After Valentine lost the Intercontinental Heavyweight Title to Tito Santana, Hart briefly co-managed the Dream Team (Valentine and Beefcake), until he was phased out and gave full control to "Luscious Johnny" Valiant. At WrestleMania, Hart also managed King Kong Bundy as he defeated S.D. Jones. Hart later traded Bundy's contract to Bobby "The Brain" Heenan for The Missing Link and Adrian Adonis. He helped the latter to establish his "Adorable Adrian" gimmick. Hart also managed Jim "The Anvil" Neidhart. 1985 also marked the appearance of the legendary Bret "Hitman" Hart. Jimmy Hart teamed him up with Jim "The Anvil" Neidhart to form The Hart Foundation. On January 26, 1987, Hart guided the Hart Foundation to the WWF World Tag Team Title, which they won from the British Bulldogs. Disgraced-referee-turned-wrestler Danny Davis also was managed by Jimmy Hart.

In 1985, Hart took the Funk Family under his wing. The Funks included Terry and Hoss Funk, as well as their kayfabe brother Jimmy Jack Funk. Hart wrestled on house shows with the Funks. On July 12, 1986, Hart won a battle royal to receive $50,000 at Madison Square Garden. When The Honky Tonk Man turned heel, Hart became his manager. In this position, Hart was nicknamed "The Colonel" in a reference to Colonel Tom Parker, the manager of Elvis Presley. With Hart in his corner, the Honky Tonk Man captured the Intercontinental Heavyweight Title from Ricky "The Dragon" Steamboat on June 2, 1987, and held it until August 1988. During that time, the Honky Tonk Man feuded with Randy Savage and his manager Miss Elizabeth.  "The Colonel" moniker stuck with him for years, even after the Honky Tonk Man departed the company in early 1991. At WrestleMania III, Hart was involved in three matches and took some incredible bumps during the show. His first appearance was with "Adorable" Adrian Adonis who fought Rowdy Roddy Piper. Then came the six-man tag match, pitting the Hart Foundation and Danny Davis against the Bulldogs and Tito Santana. Jimmy Hart's third appearance on the show was when The Honky Tonk Man fought Jake "The Snake" Roberts who had rock legend Alice Cooper in his corner. Following that match, Hart was left alone in the ring where Roberts and Cooper teamed up to terrorise him with Roberts' pet snake Damien. Also in 1987, Hart managed the WWF Women's Tag Team champions Judy Martin and Leilani Kai, known as The Glamour Girls. Martin and Kai mostly feuded with Japanese team the Jumping Bomb Angels (Noriyo Tateno and Itsuki Yamazaki).

Hart was named Pro Wrestling Illustrateds Manager of the Year in 1987, an award he won again in 1994. At WrestleMania IV, Hart received a haircut from Brutus "The Barber" Beefcake, after interfering in the Intercontinental Heavyweight Championship match between Beefcake and the Honky Tonk Man, helping Honky Tonk Man retain the title by getting disqualified. When the Hart Foundation fired Hart as manager (and turned face) in 1988, Hart managed The Fabulous Rougeau Brothers to feud with his former team; the angle was that Hart still retained the managerial rights to his former team and gave a portion of it to the Rougeaus, giving them the right to appear at ringside whenever the Hart Foundation wrestled. At SummerSlam 1988, Hart accompanied Demolition and Mr. Fuji to help retain their WWF Tag Team title against the Hart Foundation. Ax used Hart's megaphone as a foreign object to strike Bret in the head and secure the victory. In 1989, Hart brought Dino Bravo into his stable after the departure of Frenchy Martin. Then at a push-up contest between the Ultimate Warrior and Bravo, Hart and Bravo invited a large 460-pound man from the audience – later known as Earthquake – into the ring to sit on the contestants' backs. Predictably the large man was planted in the audience by Hart and Bravo and they eventually teamed up against the Warrior. In 1990, Hart groomed Earthquake to be the man to beat Hulk Hogan. Hart continued his war with his former tag team, the Hart Foundation. In 1990, he combined his protégés Honky Tonk Man and Greg Valentine into the short-lived team of Rhythm and Blues, though they had teamed previously as themselves when facing the Hart Foundation at WrestleMania V. In 1991, he managed The Nasty Boys to defeat the Hart Foundation for the WWF World Tag Team title at WrestleMania VII, this time using a motorbike helmet as a weapon.

When the Nasty Boys lost the title to the Legion of Doom at SummerSlam 1991, Hart sent The Natural Disasters, a team formed out of Earthquake and his former opponent Typhoon (formerly known as Tugboat), to depose the new champions. When the Disasters failed, Hart formed a new team in early 1992: Money Inc., composed of Hart's protégé I.R.S. and "The Million Dollar Man" Ted DiBiase. Money, Inc. defeated the L.O.D. Their title win led to the split between Hart and the Natural Disasters, who as faces feuded with Money Inc. and exchanged the tag team titles twice in 1992. Their biggest match came at WrestleMania VIII when Money Inc. retained their titles by leaving the ring and forcing a count-out. In 1991, Hart had also brought in The Mountie, who had a short reign as Intercontinental Heavyweight Champion in early 1992 after defeating Bret Hart on January 17, then losing it just two days later to Rowdy Roddy Piper at the Royal Rumble. A few months earlier, The Mountie feuded with the Big Boss Man over who was the "law and order" in the WWF. Their feud culminated in a match at SummerSlam where the loser (in this case The Mountie) had to spend the night in a New York jail. Late in 1992, Money Inc. regaining the tag team titles from the Natural Disasters led to the Nasty Boys turning on their manager, as he had repeatedly substituted them for Money Inc. in title matches.

Hart broke with Money Inc. early in 1993 and turned face when the team attacked Brutus "The Barber" Beefcake. In the storyline, Hart, conscious of Beefcake's extensive facial injuries from a real-life parasailing accident three years prior which required extensive re-constructive surgery to Beefcake's face and all but ended his full-time career, felt that his team went too far, and tried to stop them. Hart even went so far as to cover an unconscious Beefcake with his own body to stop them from doing more harm. Beefcake's long time friend Hulk Hogan came out the following week and expressed gratitude to Hart for his uncharacteristically heroic actions. He managed both Beefcake and Hogan who at WrestleMania IX lost to Money Inc by disqualification. Later in the show, Hart for the first time would be the manager of the WWF World Heavyweight Champion when Hogan accepted an impromptu challenge by Mr. Fuji, the manager of the new champion Yokozuna who had just defeated Bret Hart for the belt. Hogan would defeat the  new champion in a short match. At King of the Ring, Hart was in Hogan's corner as he lost the WWF World Heavyweight Title back to Yokozuna. This appearance was Hart's last in the WWF, as both he and Hogan departed the company.

World Championship Wrestling (1994–2001)
Following their departure from the WWF, Hogan and Hart briefly toured Mexico. After their return, Hart wrote music and occasionally appeared on Hogan's television show, Thunder in Paradise. Hogan then had Hart manage him when they went to World Championship Wrestling (WCW). At Bash at the Beach in 1994, Hart managed Hogan to win his first WCW World Heavyweight Title by defeating "The Nature Boy" Ric Flair.

At Halloween Havoc in 1995, Hart turned on Hogan to help The Giant. Hart also became the manager of the evil faction, the Dungeon of Doom, created by Kevin Sullivan. During that era, he managed Ric Flair to a 12th world title victory over Macho Man Randy Savage at Starrcade '95. After the demise of the Dungeon of Doom, Hart recreated The First Family. After the demise of the First Family, Hart was placed in charge of booking TBS's WCW Saturday Night show prior to the program's cancellation. Hart wrestled on April 18, 1999, to defeat Bubba the Love Sponge by disqualification at a house show. On November 15, he wrestled WCW Monday Nitro losing to Norman Smiley in a Hardcore match. Jimmy Hart was also the first Strapmaster for the Yapapi Indian strap match in which Hulk Hogan defeated Ric Flair on March 19, 2000, at the Uncensored PPV. At Spring Stampede in 2000, Hart faced radio personality Mancow. The two had a rematch later in the year at Mayhem. In February 2001, Hart joined WCW's booking committee.

Independent circuit; Wrestlicious (2002–present)

After the sale of WCW to the then rival WWF, Hart and a close consortium of wrestlers and investors decided to create a wrestling organization—the Xcitement Wrestling Federation (XWF)—that would replace WCW as well as take wrestling back to early 1990s style of fun, family-oriented entertainment with minimal story lines and more solid wrestling. In 2002, Hart restarted his feud with Jerry Lawler by buying, for the XWF, part of the upstart Memphis Wrestling promotion. Hart would wrestle for Memphis Wrestling from 2003 to 2005. He lost to Jimmy Valiant in a Loser Eats Dog Food match on August 2, 2003. In 2007, Hart appeared at the PMG Clash of Legends. On November 7, 2008, Hart appeared at the Jerry "The King" Lawler 35th anniversary event. He also made a few appearances with Florida Championship Wrestling, WWE's developmental territory, as a color commentator in 2008. He made multiple appearances for WrestleMania Axxess during the week leading up to The 25th Anniversary of WrestleMania.

In May 2006, Hart traveled to The Funking Conservatory, owned by Dory Funk Jr and Marti Funk, to shoot promos with the students. His most notable ones being with Studio Sar Ah when he discusses his move from World Wrestling Entertainment to TNA Wrestling and as well as Wrestlicious. Both promos can be found on the Studio Sar Ah fan page on Facebook and as well as YouTube. Hart continues to work at the school and shoot promos. On January 19, 2010, Hart announced that his all-female wrestling promotion Wrestlicious would be premiering on MavTV and BiteTV on March 1, 2010. He wrestled at Pro Wrestling Guerrilla's Kurt RussellReunion II: The Reunioning in a battle royal won by Roddy Piper. On January 12, 2012, he wrestled at PWS WrestleReunion VI in battle royal won by The Godfather. Hart currently appears at various professional wrestling conventions and autograph signings around the United States. He is a staple at all of the Wrestlereunion shows, and also does various appearances as part of the VOC Nation wrestling radio program in Philadelphia on 1360 WNJC. Hart is a regular guest on the VOC Wrestling Nation radio program on WNJC.

Total Nonstop Action Wrestling (2003–2011)
In October 2003 Hart made his debut for Total Nonstop Action Wrestling (TNA), hyping a match between Hulk Hogan and Jeff Jarrett, which was eventually scrapped as Hogan decided to return to WWE instead. On June 19, 2005, at Slammiversary pay-per-view, The Naturals were assisted in a title defense against Team Canada by Hart, who ran to ringside and threw his megaphone to Chase Stevens, who hit Petey Williams with it and pinned him. Hart acted as the manager of The Naturals until October 3, 2005. On February 14, 2010, at Against All Odds, Hart made his return to TNA as a heel by helping The Nasty Boys defeat Team 3D in a tag team match. The alliance, however, was short-lived, as on March 29, 2010, news broke that the Nasty Boys had been released by TNA following an incident at a TNA function with Spike executives present. Hart stayed with the company following the incident, but his role was unknown. Hart was seen on the January 20, 2011, edition of Impact!, when Kurt Angle yelled at him to play his entrance music upon entering the Impact! Zone.

Return to WWE (2011–present)

On March 1, 2011, it was reported that Jimmy Hart had left Total Nonstop Action Wrestling and re-signed with WWE to work on WrestleMania-related projects. Hart has since hosted various house shows. On August 14, 2011, Hart made an appearance at SummerSlam, teasing a managerial position with R-Truth during a backstage segment. On April 10, 2012, Hart made an appearance on SmackDown: Blast from the Past, where he managed the team of Heath Slater and Tyson Kidd, but ended up getting the mandible claw from Mick Foley.

As of April 30, 2014, Hart was part-owner of "Hogan's Beach", a wrestling-themed tiki-bar in Tampa, Florida. As of April 2014, Hart was a regular cast member on the WWE Network original reality show Legends' House.
Hart appeared on the August 11 edition of Raw for Hogan's birthday celebration.
In April 2017, Hart purchased a beachfront property in Daytona Beach, Florida, and opened “Jimmy Hart’s Hall of Fame Bar and Tiki Deck“, which is a beach bar featuring an abundance of autographed pictures, wrestling paraphernalia, and at times an intercontinental championship belt.
On January 4, 2021, he made an appearance on the RAW Legends Night where he was involved in a segment with Hulk Hogan, Drew McIntyre and Sheamus.

On January 23, 2023, Hart appeared on WWE Raw is XXX, the 30th anniversary edition of Monday Night Raw (once again accompanying Hulk Hogan to open the show), having only ever been a prominent presence on Raw (he left WWF a few months after the show's premiere).

Other media
His book, The Mouth of the South, was released on November 18, 2004. Jimmy has also appeared in "Life: for sale" a YouTube series created by Koncrete Inc., which has Benjamin Mallah as its lead.

Music
Before wrestling, Hart, as a teenager, was a vocalist in the 60s band The Gentrys, who had a million selling record with 1965's "Keep on Dancing". Before becoming The Gentrys, they were known as just "The Gents." Their production manager told them that if they did not change their name, then they would not succeed in the music industry. Later, after the leader of the group Larry Raspberry left, Hart took over and they had a few minor hits, most notably "Why Should I Cry" and a cover of Neil Young's "Cinnamon Girl", but were never able to match the success of "Keep on Dancing." Hart and the band were successful in the Memphis area nightclub circuit. The group was under contract to Stax Records at the time of its bankruptcy, and Stax could not properly promote them.

During his years in the professional wrestling business, Hart composed many theme songs for wrestlers in the WWF and WCW. Some of the wrestlers for whom he composed music were Honky Tonk Man, Jimmy Snuka, Brutus "The Barber" Beefcake, The Rockers, The Hart Foundation, Crush, the Fabulous Rougeau Brothers, Dusty Rhodes, the Legion of Doom, the Nasty Boys, Ted DiBiase, the Mountie, Hulk Hogan, Sting, the nWo Wolfpac, and 3 Count. He also composed the themes for SummerSlam '88 (which was later reused as the theme for many early Royal Rumble events) and WrestleMania VI (which was later used for the seventh, eighth, ninth, and tenth events). One of Hart's most notable compositions is Shawn Michaels's entrance theme, "Sexy Boy."

In the late 1980s, Hart released a music album (also available on cassette tape) titled Outrageous Conduct. The release consisted of comical songs done in character; such as "Barbra Streisand's Nose" and "Eat Your Heart Out Rick Springfield." In 1995, Hulk Hogan released the album "Hulk Rules, on Select Records." Hart, as well as Hogan's then wife Linda, were a part of the band The Wrestling Boot Band and helped write and sing many of the album's songs.

Television appearances

In September 2007, Hart appeared on an episode of The People's Court as a witness for a defendant. Hart is a close friend of Hulk Hogan and is featured on many episodes of Hogan's VH1 reality series, Hogan Knows Best. Hart was also a judge on Hulk Hogan's Celebrity Championship Wrestling. Hart also appears in hair restoration advertisements for Medical Hair Restoration, as a client. He also does a comedic women's wrestling show called Wrestlicious, which can be viewed at Wrestlicious.com. Hart appeared on the WWE Legends' House. Hart has appeared a few times in Hulk Hogan's TV-show Thunder in Paradise. He also sang the intro music for the episode "Deadly Lessons, Pt. 1".

Youtube appearances
Jimmy Hart is a constant on Life for Sale with real estate investor Ben Mallah — the $250,000,000 Real Estate Mogul.

Movie appearances
In 1967, Hart appeared in the film It's a Bikini World as a member of The Gentrys. In 2010, Hart appeared in the Insane Clown Posse's film Big Money Rustlas. In 2011, Hart appeared as himself in the Canadian movie Monster Brawl. Hart played the announcer to a wrestling tournament of eight classic monsters that fight to the death.

Championships and accomplishmentsAmerican Wrestling AssociationAWA Southern Heavyweight Championship (1 time)Cauliflower Alley ClubManager's Award (2015)Memphis Wrestling Hall of FameClass of 2017Pro Wrestling IllustratedManager of the Year (1987, 1994)World Class Wrestling AssociationHall of Fame (2006)World Wrestling EntertainmentWWE Hall of Fame (Class of 2005)Wrestling Observer Newsletter'''''
Manager of the Year (1983)
Best on Interviews (1984)
Wrestling Observer Newsletter Hall of Fame (Class of 2018)

References

Further reading

External links

Memphis Wrestling History 

1944 births
American male singers
American male songwriters
American rock singers
Businesspeople from Jackson, Mississippi
Living people
People from Memphis, Tennessee
Professional wrestling executives
Professional wrestling managers and valets
Songwriters from Mississippi
The First Family (professional wrestling) members
The Hart Foundation members
WWE Hall of Fame inductees